The Lilājan River (also known by its Sanskrit name: Nirañjanā) is a river that flows through the Chatra and Gaya districts in the Indian states of Jharkhand and Bihar. It is also referred to as the Nilanjan, Niranjana or Falgu River.

Course

The Lilājan begins its journey north of Simaria in Chatra district on the Hazaribagh plateau, the western portion of which constitutes a broad watershed
between the Damodar drainage on the south and the Lilājan and Mohana rivers on the north. It flows through a deep and rocky channel until it reaches the neighbourhood of Jori. There the hills begin to recede and the stream flows sluggishly over a wide sandy bed. From this point to the Gaya border beyond Hunterganj the river becomes sandy. It is dry in summer but disastrous during the rains.

Bichkiliya waterfalls
The water falls into a dah or natural reservoir in the Lilājan River.

Buddhism
Before attaining Enlightenment, the prince Siddhārtha Gautama practiced asceticism for six years (ten or twelve years according to some accounts) on the banks of the river, residing in a forest near the village of Uruvilvā. After realizing that strict asceticism would not lead to Enlightenment, he recuperated after bathing in the river and receiving a bowl of milk-rice from the milkmaid Sujātā.

He sat under the nearby pippala tree, where he finally achieved Enlightenment. This tree became known as the Bodhi Tree, and the site became known as Bodh Gayā.

References

External links
 View of the river

Rivers of Jharkhand
Rivers of Bihar
Rivers in Buddhism
Rivers of India